Indonesia competed at the 2013 Summer Universiade in Kazan, Russia. 34 student-athletes will participate on its competition program.

Medalists

References

Nations at the 2013 Summer Universiade
2013 in Indonesian sport
Indonesia at the Summer Universiade